KNM ER 3883 is the catalogue number of a fossilized skull (nearly complete cranium) of the species Homo ergaster (alternatively referred to as African Homo erectus). The fossil was discovered by Richard Leakey in 1976 in Koobi Fora, east of Lake Turkana (formerly lake Rudolf), Kenya.

Observations 

Most of the facial skeleton of the fossil is missing. Only the Neurocranium is in a fairly complete state. Researchers have calculated that the fossil is about 1.6 million years old and likely represents a male. KNM ER 3883 is a more robust and a little larger than KNM ER 3733. The cranium is long and low and it has postorbital construction. It has a large face and zygomatic bone. It shows a cranial capacity greater than any previous hominid capacity which is estimated at 804 ml.

References 

Homo erectus fossils